The 1988 Copa del Rey was the 52nd edition of the Spanish basketball Cup. It was organized by the ACB and its Final Eight was played in Valladolid, in the Pabellón Polideportivo Pisuerga between 19 and 21 December 1987.

This edition was played by the four first qualified of the 1987–88 ACB first stage.

Qualified teams

Group Even

|}

Group Odd

|}

Bracket

Final
A buzzer-beater of Ignacio Solozábal allowed FC Barcelona to repeat the title of Copa del Rey.

References

External links
Boxscores at ACB.com
Linguasport

Copa del Rey de Baloncesto
1987–88 in Spanish basketball